Justin II (died 5 October 578) was Eastern Roman Emperor from 565 until 578. He was the nephew of Justinian I and the husband of Sophia, the niece of the Empress Theodora, and was therefore a member of the Justinian dynasty.

Justin II inherited a greatly enlarged but overextended empire, with far less resources at his disposal compared to Justinian I. Despite this, he strived to match his formidable uncle's reputation by abandoning the payment of tributes to the Empire's neighbors. This miscalculated move resulted in rekindling of war with the Sassanid Empire, and in a Lombard invasion which cost the Romans much of their territory in Italy.

Family
He was a son of Vigilantia and Dulcidio (sometimes rendered as Dulcissimus), respectively the sister and brother-in-law of Justinian. His siblings included Marcellus and Praejecta. With Sophia he had a daughter Arabia and possibly a son, Justus, who died young. He also had a niece named Helena.

Reign

Accession 

Justinian I died childless on 14 November 565. , the praepositus sacri cubiculi, seems to have been the only witness to his dying moments, and later claimed that Justinian had designated "Justin, Vigilantia's son" as his heir in a deathbed decision. The clarification was needed because there was another nephew and candidate for the throne, Justin, son of Germanus. Modern historians suspect Callinicus may have fabricated the last words of Justinian to secure the succession for his political ally. As historian Robert Browning observed: "Did Justinian really bring himself in the end to make a choice, or did Callinicus make it for him? Only Callinicus knew."

In any case, Callinicus started alerting those most interested in the succession, originally various members of the Byzantine Senate. Then they jointly informed Justin and Vigilantia, offering the throne. Justin accepted after the traditional token show of reluctance, and with his wife Sophia, he was escorted to the Great Palace of Constantinople. The Excubitors blocked the palace entrances during the night, and early in the morning, John Scholasticus, Patriarch of Constantinople, crowned the new Augustus. Only then was the death of Justinian and the succession of Justin publicly announced in the Hippodrome of Constantinople.

Both the Patriarch and Tiberius, commander of the Excubitors, had been recently appointed, with Justin having played a part in their respective appointments, in his role as Justinian's curopalates. Their willingness to elevate their patron and ally to the throne was hardly surprising.

In the first few days of his reign Justin paid his uncle's debts, administered justice in person, and proclaimed universal religious toleration. On 1 January 566, he became a consul, thereby reviving a post Justinian had discontinued since 541. Justin and Sophia initially promised to make peace with Justin's cousin and rival to the throne, Justin (son of Germanus), but had him assassinated in Alexandria not long after. According to a hostile source, the imperial couple kicked his severed head.

In 566 he reformed Justinian's divorce law for going too far, revoking the possibility of divorce by mutual consent. Under the pretext of not understanding the fragile human nature:

Foreign policy 
Faced with an empty treasury, he discontinued Justinian's practice of buying off potential enemies. Immediately after his accession, Justin halted the payment of subsidies to the Avars, ending a truce that had existed since 558. This move upset the delicate balance of power in the Pannonian Basin, since the Avar elite were forced to seek new sources of wealth to maintain their position and client networks. After the Avars and the neighbouring tribe of the Lombards had combined to destroy the Gepids, from whom Justin had obtained the Danube fortress of Sirmium, Avar pressure caused the Lombards to migrate West, and in 568 they invaded Italy under their king Alboin. They quickly overran the Po valley, and within a few years they had made themselves masters of nearly the entire country. The Avars themselves crossed the Danube in 573 or 574, when the Empire's attention was distracted by troubles on the Persian frontier. They were only placated by the payment of a subsidy of 60,000 silver pieces by Justin's successor Tiberius.

The North and East frontiers were the main focus of Justin's attention. In 572 his refusal to pay tribute to the Persians in combination with overtures to the Turks led to a war with the Sassanid Empire. After two disastrous campaigns, in which the Persians under Khosrow I overran Syria and captured the strategically important fortress of Dara, Justin lost his mind.

Shortly after the smuggling of silkworm eggs into the Byzantine Empire from China by Nestorian Christian monks, the 6th-century Byzantine historian Menander Protector writes of how the Sogdians attempted to establish a direct trade of Chinese silk with the Byzantine Empire. After forming an alliance with the Sassanid ruler Khosrow I to defeat the Hephthalite Empire, Istämi, the Göktürk ruler of the Western Turkic Khaganate, was approached by Sogdian merchants requesting permission to seek an audience with the Sassanid king of kings for the privilege of traveling through Persian territories in order to trade with the Byzantines. Istämi refused the first request, but when he sanctioned the second one and had the Sogdian embassy sent to the Sassanid king, the latter had the members of the embassy poisoned to death. Maniah, a Sogdian diplomat, convinced Istämi to send an embassy directly to Constantinople, which arrived in 568 and offered not only silk as a gift to Justin, but also proposed an alliance against Sassanid Persia. Justin agreed and sent an embassy to the Turkic Khaganate, ensuring the direct silk trade desired by the Sogdians.

In 1937, the historian Previte-Orton described Justin as "a rigid man, dazzled by his predecessor's glories, to whom fell the task of guiding an exhausted, ill-defended Empire through a crisis of the first magnitude and a new movement of peoples". Previte-Orton continues,

Succession and death 

After 572, Justin was reported to have fits of insanity. John of Ephesus, whose Monophysite sect suffered persecutions under Justin, offered a vivid description of Justin's madness, in which he behaved like a wild animal, was wheeled about on a mobile throne and required organ music to be played day and night. In 574, at Sophia's suggestion, he adopted the general Tiberius as his son and heir, and then retired in his favor. On 7 December, according to Theophylact Simocatta, Justin remained sufficiently clear-minded to make an eloquent speech as he passed the crown:

Four years later, on 26 September 578, he elevated Tiberius as Augustus. Justin died only nine days later, on 5 October 578.

Footnotes

References

Sources

Primary sources
Edward Walford, translator (1846) The Ecclesiastical History of Evagrius: A History of the Church from AD 431 to AD 594, Reprinted 2008. Evolution Publishing, .

Secondary sources

External links

 DIR: De Imperatoribus Romanis: Justin II

6th-century births
578 deaths
6th-century Byzantine emperors
6th-century Roman consuls
Imperial Roman consuls
Justinian dynasty
Kouropalatai
People of the Roman–Sasanian Wars
Royalty and nobility with disabilities